Michigan Talk Network (often abbreviated MTN) is an internet-distributed, syndicated talk radio service that has a variety of programs airing on 20 radio affiliates in the U.S. state of Michigan. It operates in coordination with its flagship station WJIM in Lansing, Michigan and is owned by Steve Gruber, host of the Network's morning show.

The Steve Gruber Show is MTN's morning program and its flagship product; it airs live weekdays 6–9 am ET. Ivey Ramos Gruber is the programs Executive Producer and is also a frequent on air contributor. Past guests include: former President Donald Trump, Mike Pence, Gov. Rick Snyder, Steve Forbes, Dana Perino, Ted Nugent, Gov. Scott Walker, Senator Rand Paul, Dr. John Lott and more. Some or all of the show airs on 9 radio stations including:  WJIM, WKMI, WFNT, WAAM, WTKG, WBCH, WLDN, WMLQ, & WMIQ.

Programs
 The Steve Gruber Show
 The C.A.R. Show (hosted by Roger Kwapich, Dan Pietras and Steve Stewart)
 The Tom Matt Show
 The Internet Advisor (hosted by Foster Braun, Gary Baker and Ed Rudel)
 Travel Michigan (with Dave Lorenz, and Michelle Grinnell)
 Wild Michigan with Duran Martinez (outdoors show)
 The Grillin' Guys

American radio networks